Daniela Gurz is a Romanian football defender currently playing for ENP Famagusta FC. She has played the Champions League with CFF Clujana, FCM Târgu Mureş and Olimpia Cluj, and she made her debut for the Romanian national team in the 2013 European Championship qualifying against Kazakhstan.

References

Living people
Romanian women's footballers
1991 births
Romania women's international footballers
Women's association football defenders
FCU Olimpia Cluj players
CFF Clujana players
People from Cluj County